This list includes Immovable Cultural Heritage sites in the Pčinja District of Serbia.

Cultural monuments

Archaeological Sites

Spatial Cultural-Historical Units

References

Cultural heritage of Serbia
Monuments and memorials in Serbia